Chaudhry Azhar Qayyum Nahra (born 1 January 1977) is a Pakistani politician who has been a member of the National Assembly of Pakistan, since August 2018. Previously, he was a member of the National Assembly from June 2013 to May 2018.

Early life
He was born on 1 January 1977.

Political career
He ran for the seat of the National Assembly of Pakistan as a candidate of Pakistan Muslim League (N) (PML-N) from Constituency NA-100 (Gujranwala-VI) in by-elections held in 2010, but was unsuccessful. He received 61,818 votes and lost the seat to Chaudry Tussadiq Masud Khan. The seat was fallen vacant due to the resignation of Muddasir Qayyum Nahra.

He was elected to the National Assembly as a candidate of PML-N from Constituency NA-100 (Gujranwala-VI) in 2013 Pakistani general election. He received 89,826 votes and defeated an independent candidate, Chaudhry Bilal Ijaz. During his tenure as Member of the National Assembly, he served as the Federal Parliamentary Secretary for Water and Power. In October 2017, he was made Federal Parliamentary Secretary for Postal Services.

He was re-elected to the National Assembly as a candidate of PML-N from Constituency NA-84 (Gujranwala-VI) in 2018 Pakistani general election.

References

Living people
Pakistan Muslim League (N) politicians
Punjabi people
Pakistani MNAs 2013–2018
1977 births
Pakistani MNAs 2018–2023